Le Matin d'Algérie (The Sunrise of Algeria) is an Algerian online newspaper. According to the newspaper's self-description on its website, it aims to continue in the tradition of the paper newspaper, Le Matin, arbitrarily suspended by the Algerian authorities in July 2004.

References

External links 
 Official website

Algerian news websites
French-language newspapers published in Algeria
Mass media in Algiers
Newspapers established in 2017
2017 establishments in Algeria